The 62nd General Assembly of Prince Edward Island was in session from November 12, 2003 to April 30, 2007. The Progressive Conservative Party led by Pat Binns formed the government.

Gregory Deighan was elected speaker.

There were four sessions of the 62nd General Assembly:

Members

Notes:

References
 Election results for the Prince Edward Island Legislative Assembly, 2003-09-29
 Mars-Proietti, Laura Canadian Parliamentary Guide, 2008 

Terms of the General Assembly of Prince Edward Island
2003 establishments in Prince Edward Island
2007 disestablishments in Prince Edward Island